The men's long jump event was part of the track and field athletics programme at the 1928 Summer Olympics. The competition was held on Tuesday, July 31, 1928. Forty-one long jumpers from 23 nations competed. The maximum number of athletes per nation was 4. The event was won by Ed Hamm of the United States, the nation's second consecutive and seventh overall victory in the event. Silvio Cator earned Haiti's first medal in the event by taking silver.

Background

This was the eighth appearance of the event, which is one of 12 athletics events to have been held at every Summer Olympics. The returning finalists from the 1924 Games were the defending champion, DeHart Hubbard of the United States, and fourth-place finisher Vilho Tuulos of Finland. Hubbard had an ankle injury, however. Ed Hamm had set the world record at the 1928 AAU championship and was the "heavy favorite."

Chile, Denmark, Ireland, South Africa, and Spain each made their first appearance in the event. The United States appeared for the eighth time, the only nation to have long jumpers at each of the Games thus far.

Competition format

The 1928 format continued to use the two-round format used in 1900 and since 1908, with the six-man finals introduced in 1920. Instead of having ties all advance (as in 1924), the next-best jump was used to break ties. Each jumper had three jumps in the qualifying round; finalists received an additional three jumps, with qualifying round jumps still counting if the final jumps were not better.

Records

These were the standing world and Olympic records (in metres) prior to the 1928 Summer Olympics.

(*) Robert LeGendre set the Olympic record in the 1924 pentathlon contest

Schedule

Results

The best six long jumpers qualified for the final. Two jumpers, Hannes de Boer and Ed Gordon, tied for sixth place, but only de Boer advanced to the final as his second best jump (6.96) was better than the second best jump of Gordon (6.57). The jumping order is not available and the jumping series are only available for the best six jumpers. 
The final was held on the same day and started at 2 p.m. No jumper was able to improve his qualification width.

References

External links
 Official Olympic Report
 

Long
Long jump at the Olympics
Men's events at the 1928 Summer Olympics